Tanipone is a Malagasy genus of ants in the subfamily Dorylinae.

Distribution
Endemic to Madagascar, species of Tanipone are predominantly terrestrial to subarboreal, being found as ground foragers in leaf litter, under stones, in rotten stumps and in rotten logs. Just as commonly workers have been captured on low vegetation, in living and dead stems above the ground and in rot pockets in tree trunks.

Species

 Tanipone aglandula Bolton & Fisher, 2012
 Tanipone aversa Bolton & Fisher, 2012
 Tanipone cognata Bolton & Fisher, 2012
 Tanipone hirsuta Bolton & Fisher, 2012
 Tanipone maculata Bolton & Fisher, 2012
 Tanipone pilosa Bolton & Fisher, 2012
 Tanipone scelesta Bolton & Fisher, 2012
 Tanipone subpilosa Bolton & Fisher, 2012
 Tanipone varia Bolton & Fisher, 2012
 Tanipone zona Bolton & Fisher, 2012

References

Dorylinae
Ant genera
Hymenoptera of Africa